Marc Lavoine is a 2001 album recorded by French singer-songwriter and actor Marc Lavoine. It was released on November 27, 2001, and even if it failed to reach the top ten, it achieved success in France and Belgium (Wallonia), where it remained charted respectively for two and one years.

Background
This album was composed of new songs and singer's old songs overdubbed as duets, such as "Chère amie (toutes mes excuses)" and "Paris". Lavoine's 1984 hit single "Elle a les yeux revolver" was also included as hidden track in a slower version. "Mucho embrasse-moi" is a cover version of Dalida's hit "Besame mucho", with other lyrics. 1980s singers and musicians Philippe Russo, Alain Lanty and Christophe Deschamps participated in the recording of the album.

The album provided four singles, included two top ten hits (two duets of the album : "J'ai tout oublié", with Cristina Marocco, and "Je ne veux qu'elle", with Claire Keim) and allowed Lavoine to obtain his first number-one hit. The other two singles, "Le Pont Mirabeau" and "J'aurais voul", flopped, failing the top 50 in France.

In France, the album started at No. 13 on October 13, 2001. It peaked at No. 11 in its 19th week and remained for 70 weeks in the top 50 and 96 weeks on the chart (top 150). It was eventually certified Double Platinum by the SNEP, the French provider. After leaving the albums chart, it topped the Top Mid'Price / Back Catalogue for four weeks.

Release history

Track listings
 "Le Pont Mirabeau" (Guillaume Apollinaire, Marc Lavoine) – 3:18
 "Passent les nuages" (Jacques Duvall, Frédéric Momont) – 3:43
 "J'aurais voulu" (Marc Esposito, Marc Lavoine, Bedřich Smetana) – 4:27
 "Je ne veux qu'elle" (J. Kapler, Marc Lavoine) (duet with Claire Keim) – 3:58
 "Mucho embrasse-moi" (Consuelo Velázquez, adapt. Marc Lavoine) – 4:17
 "Chère amie (toutes mes excuses)" (Fabrice Aboulker, Marc Lavoine) (duet with Françoise Hardy) – 3:37
 "N'oublie jamais" (Marc Lavoine, Romano Musumarra) – 4:09
 "Paris" (Fabrice Aboulker, Marc Lavoine) (duet with Souad Massi) – 5:03
 "Deux Guitares au soleil" (Marc Lavoine, Romano Musumarra) – 4:41
 "Ma Jonque est jaune" (Jean Fauque, Marc Lavoine) – 3:28
 "J'ai tout oublié" (Marc Lavoine, Georges Lunghini) (duet with Cristina Marocco) – 4:05
 "Ma solitude.com" (Marc Lavoine, Richard Mortier) – 2:45
 "Elle a les yeux revolver..." (Fabrice Aboulker, Marc Lavoine) (hidden track) – 5:38

Source : Allmusic

Credits
 Musicians
 Drums : Christophe Deschamps (tracks 1,2,9), Regis Ceccarelli (track 7)
 Bass : Laurent Vernerey (tracks 1,2,4,9)
 Piano : Jean-François Berger (tracks 1,10), Alain Lanty (track 5,6)
 Keyboards : Jean-François Berger (track 1,5,8)
 Guitar : Jean-François Berger (track 1,5), Victor (tracks 3), Jean-François Kellner (track 8), Dominic Miller (track 9)
 Acoustic guitar : Franck Amseli (track 2), Hugh Burns (track 4), Jean-Pierre Bucolo (track 10)
 Electric guitar : Philippe Russo (tracks 2,4), Victor (tracks 2,10)
 Programmations : Jean-François Berger (track 1,2,5,8,10,11), François Delabrière (tracks 2,8), Mathew Vaughan (tracks 3–5,9-11)
 Background vocals : Marc Lavoine (tracks 1,2), Claire Keim (tracks 2,11)
 Dobro : Jean-Pierre Bucolo (track 4)
 Trumpet : Jean-François Berger (track 5)
 First violin : Gavyn Wright (tracks 1,9,11), Perry Montague-Mason (tracks 2–5,10), Christophe Guiot (tracks 6,7)
 Percussion : Rabah Kahlfa (track 8)
 Double bass : Rémi Vignolo (track 7)
 Oud : Ahmed Djouhri (track 8)
 Accordion : Jean-François Berger (track 8)
 Arrangements : Souad Massi (track 8)
 Flute : Michel Gaucher (track 9)
 Buggle : Christian Martinez (track 9)
 Mellotron : Jean-François Berger (track 12)

 Recording
 Engineered by François Delabrière
 Mixed by François Delabrière at Mega studio
 Mastered by Ian Cooper at Metropolis Mastering, London
 String arrangements and conducting : Jean-François Berger
 Produced by François Delabrière, Jean-François Berger and Marc Lavoine
 Strings contractors : Isobel Griffiths (tracks 1–5, 9–11), Christophe Guiot (tracks 6,7)
 Artistic direction : Egidio Alves Martins
 Assistant : Thomas Sandoval
 Made in the EU

Certifications and sales

Charts

References

2001 albums
Marc Lavoine albums
Mercury Records albums